MotoGP is a class of the Road Racing World Championship Grand Prix.

MotoGP may also refer to:

 Motorcycle Grand Prix, a grand prix race on motorcycles
MotoGP (Namco video game series)
MotoGP (2000), a video game published by Namco
MotoGP 2 (2002), a video game published by Namco
MotoGP 3 (2003), a video game published by Namco
MotoGP 4 (2005), a video game published by Namco
MotoGP (2006), a video game published by Namco
MotoGP (THQ video game series)
MotoGP: Ultimate Racing Technology (2002), a video game published by THQ
MotoGP: Ultimate Racing Technology 2 (2003), a video game published by THQ
MotoGP: Ultimate Racing Technology 3 (2005), a video game published by THQ
MotoGP '06 (2006), a video game published by THQ
MotoGP '07 (2007), a video game published by THQ
MotoGP (Capcom video game series)
MotoGP '07 (PS2) (2007), a video game published by Capcom
MotoGP '08 (2008), a video game published by Capcom
MotoGP 09/10 (2009), a video game published by Capcom
MotoGP 10/11 (2011), a video game published by Capcom
MotoGP (Milestone video game series)
MotoGP 13 (2013), a video game published by Milestone
MotoGP 14 (2014), a video game published by Milestone
MotoGP 15 (2015), a video game published by Milestone
MotoGP 16 (2016), a video game published by Milestone
MotoGP 17 (2017), a video game published by Milestone
MotoGP 18 (2018), a video game published by Milestone
MotoGP 19 (2019), a video game published by Milestone
MotoGP 20 (2020), a video game published by Milestone
MotoGP 21 (2021), a video game was published
MotoGP 22 (2022), a video game was published

See also

 Superbike World Championship
 Moto2
 Moto3
 Grand Prix (disambiguation)
 Motorcycle (disambiguation)
 Moto (disambiguation)
 GP (disambiguation)